Presidential elections were held in Madagascar on 16 December 2001. Initial results suggested a second round was necessary, as neither incumbent President Didier Ratsiraka nor Marc Ravalomanana, the two main candidates, had won a majority. However, Ravalomanana rejected the results and declared himself President in February 2002, resulting in violence breaking out between supporters of the two candidates. A recount was held, after which Ravalomanana was awarded 51.46% of the votes, and in April the High Constitutional Court declared him the winner. Although Ratsiraka rejected the verdict, the United States recognised Ravalomanana as President in June, and the following month Ratsiraka fled to France.

Results

References

Madagascar
2001 in Madagascar
Presidential elections in Madagascar
December 2001 events in Africa